Noah Great Voyage in Fukuoka 2022 was a professional wrestling event promoted by CyberFight's sub-brand Pro Wrestling Noah. It took place on March 21, 2022, in Fukuoka, Japan, at the Fukuoka Convention Center. The event aired on CyberAgent's AbemaTV online linear television service and CyberFight's streaming service Wrestle Universe.

Background

Storylines
The event featured nine professional wrestling matches that resulted from scripted storylines, where wrestlers portrayed villains, heroes, or less distinguishable characters in the scripted events that built tension and culminated in a wrestling match or series of matches.

Event
The event started with the bout between  Kinya Okada, Masa Kitamiya and Yoshiki Inamura and Funky Express (Akitoshi Saito, King Tany and Mohammed Yone), solded with the victory of the preceding team. Next, Kongo (Hajime Ohara, Nio and Tadasuke) defeated Alejandro, Hao and Kai Fujimura in another six-man tag team action match. The third match saw Naomichi Marufuji defeat Yasutaka Yano in singles competition. Next, Hayata and Yoshinari Ogawa picked up a victory over Eita and Super Crazy by disqualification. In the fifth match, Daiki Inaba and Kaito Kiyomiya defeated Daisuke Harada and Junta Miyawaki. Next, Go Shiozaki defeated Masaaki Mochizuki in singles competition. In the seventh match, Atsushi Kotoge and Yo-Hey defended the GHC Junior Heavyweight Tag Team Championship for the first time in that respective reign against Kotaro Suzuki and Nosawa Rongai. In the semi main event, Sugiura-gun (Hideki Suzuki, Kazushi Sakuraba, Kendo Kashin and Takashi Sugiura) defeated Kongo (Katsuhiko Nakajima, Kenoh, Manabu Soya and Masakatsu Funaki) in eight-man tag team action.

The main event portraited the confrontation between Kazuyuki Fujita and Masato Tanaka in which Fujita successfully defended the GHC Heavyweight Championship for the firs time in that respective reign.

Results

References

External links
Pro Wrestling Noah official website

Pro Wrestling Noah
CyberAgent
2022 in professional wrestling
December 2022 events in Japan
Pro Wrestling Noah shows